Sanbenito (Spanish: sambenito; Catalan: gramalleta, sambenet, Portuguese: sambenito) was a penitential garment that was used especially during the Spanish Inquisition. It was similar to a scapular, either yellow with red saltires for penitent heretics or black and decorated with devils and flames for impenitent heretics to wear at an auto-da-fé (meaning "act of faith").

Etymology
"San Benito" is the Spanish name of either Benedict the Moor or Benedict of Nursia. An alternative etymology by Covarrubias and former editions of the Diccionario de la Real Academia Española has it from saco bendito ("blessed sack"). Américo Castro "proved that it does not come from saco bendito".

Description and use
Luis González Obregon describes the three basic types of tunics used to distinguish those being punished by the Inquisition. These were the Samarra, Fuego revolto, and the Sambenito. The Samarra was painted with dragons, devils, and flames amongst which the image of the prisoner could be distinguished, signifying that the impenitent heretic was condemned to be burnt alive at the stake. The Fuego revolto was painted simply with flames pointing downwards, signifying that the heretic who became penitent after being condemned was not to be burnt alive at the stake, but was to have the mercy of being strangled before the fire was lit. Finally the Sambenito featured red saltires, whose wearer was only to do penance. Eventually all three types of tunics became known as sambenito; a conical cap, denominated coroza (and capirote), of the same material and motifs as the corresponding sambenito, would also be worn.

The heretics, found guilty by the inquisitors, had to walk in the procession wearing the sambenito as a Shirt of Flame, the coroza, the rope around the neck, the rosary, and in their hands a yellow or green wax candle.

Originally the penitential garments were hung up in the churches as mementos of disgrace to their wearers, and as the trophies of the Holy Inquisition. The lists of the punished were also called sambenitos. The bearers of the surnames of those listed in the church of Santo Domingo in Palma de Mallorca were discriminated against as xuetas (the local name for Converso Jews), even when those surnames were also borne by Old Christians and the surnames of other Majorcan Judaizers were not preserved at the cathedral.

The sanbenito should not be confused with the yellow robes worn by some monks; which are also garments related to penitence and which is one reason that caused the Inquisition to prefer common woollen dyed yellow with red crosses for the sambenito. Such were the penitential robes in 1514, when Cardinal Francisco Ximénez de Cisneros replaced the common crosses with those of Saint Andrew. The inquisitors afterwards designated a different tunic for each class of penitents.

In the 1945 edition of México Viejo, Luis González Obregón shows images from Felipe A. Limborch's Historia Inquisitionis, dated 1692, which were images of Sanbenitos used in the Inquisition.

See also
 Capirote
 Inquisition
 Inquisitorial system
 List of Grand Inquisitors of Spain
 Histoire de l'Inquisition en France
 Sackcloth
 Vatican Secret Archives

Citations

General references
 González Obregon, Luis (1945). Època Colonial, México Viejo, Noticias Históricas, Tradiciones, Leyendas y Costumbres. Editorial Patria, S.A. pp. 107–108.

Catholic religious clothing
Hats
History of Catholicism in Spain
Scapulars
Shirts
Spanish Inquisition
Portuguese Inquisition